U.S. Route 16A (US 16A or U.S. Route 16-Alternate) is a  scenic United States highway. It is an alternate route for US 16. It splits from US 16 in the Black Hills of the southwestern part of the U.S. state of South Dakota. The highway's western terminus is an intersection with US 16, US 385, and South Dakota Highway 89 (SD 89) in Custer, South Dakota. The eastern terminus is at an interchange with US 16 called the Keystone Wye south of Rapid City, South Dakota. Portions of US 16A are known as the Iron Mountain Road.

Route description

The route passes through Keystone, South Dakota; Mount Rushmore National Memorial; The Norbeck Wildlife Management Area and Black Elk Wilderness within the Black Hills National Forest; and Custer State Park (including State Game Lodge and Legion Lake); before rejoining the parent highway.

US 16A is famous for its scenic, one-lane tunnels aligned to frame the faces on Mount Rushmore, its "pigtail bridges", and its sections of divided highway but with single (and narrow) lanes on each roadway. It is the only route which can be used to drive through Custer State Park without having to pay an entrance fee for the park, provided the traveler does not stop in the Park.

The route includes most of the tunnels on the South Dakota state highway system, including the only three-lane tunnel in the state, just north of Keystone. Part of the highway is also a boundary of the Black Elk Wilderness.  The Iron Mountain portion of the road is not maintained in the winter.  The road, like several other scenic roads in the Black Hills, was originally laid out by Governor Peter Norbeck, specifically to create a very scenic, slow-speed road for tourists. The section of US 16A from SD 89 to SD 244 is known as the Peter Norbeck Memorial Byway in honor of the governor. At the highest point of the byway, on the summit of Iron Mountain, there is a small memorial to Governor Norbeck.

History

An older road through the Badlands of South Dakota (currently designated as SD 240) was designated US 16A between 1944 and 1980.

Major intersections

References

External links

The South Dakota Highways Page: Highways 1 to 30

16A (South Dakota)
16A
Black Hills
A (South Dakota)
Transportation in Custer County, South Dakota
Transportation in Pennington County, South Dakota
Mount Rushmore